Umbonium thomasi is a species of sea snail, a marine gastropod mollusk in the family Trochidae, the top snails.

Description

Distribution

References

thomasi
Gastropods described in 1862